John Heritage Bryan (November 4, 1798 – May 19, 1870) was a U.S. Representative from North Carolina.

Born in New Bern, North Carolina, Bryan studied under private teachers and attended New Bern Academy.
He graduated from the University of North Carolina in 1815, where he was a member of the Philanthropic Society.
He studied law.
He was admitted to the bar in 1819 and commenced practice in New Bern, North Carolina. 
He served as member of the State senate in 1823 and 1824.
Trustee of the University of North Carolina at Chapel Hill 1823–1868.

Bryan was elected as Jacksonian to the Nineteenth Congress and as an Adams candidate in the Twentieth Congress (March 4, 1825 – March 3, 1829).
He was not a candidate for renomination in 1828.
He resumed the practice of law in New Bern.
He moved to Raleigh in 1839 and continued the practice of law.
He died in Raleigh, North Carolina, May 19, 1870.
He was interred in Oakwood Cemetery.

The Bryan House and Office at New Bern was listed on the National Register of Historic Places in 1972.

Sources

External links
A collection of the papers of John Heritage Bryan is available at the J.Y. Joyner Library, East Carolina University.

1798 births
1870 deaths
Politicians from New Bern, North Carolina
American people of Irish descent
Jacksonian members of the United States House of Representatives from North Carolina
National Republican Party members of the United States House of Representatives from North Carolina